Comedy Champion is a Nepali stand-up comedy reality show which started airing on Kantipur Television and OSR Reality channel on YouTube since 2020. It is the first comedy reality show in Nepal. The show features emerging standup comedians from different parts of Nepal. The show primarily has standalone comedic appearances of the contestants, with some episodes of a pairing performances. The show is created by OSR Reality, one of the leading reality show production company in Nepal.

Overview
Comedy Champion features Santosh Panta, Manoj Gajurel, Reecha Sharma and Pradip Bhattarai as the judges and Rima Bishwokarma as the host of the show. One of the contestants from season 1, Bishnu Prasad Gaudel (a.k.a. Mexam Gaudel) hosted season 2 alongside Rima Bishowkarma.

Himesh Panta won the title in the first season; Khadga Bahadur Pun Magar and Suman Koirala became runner-ups. Title of the season 2 was won by Bharat Mani Poudel, where Bkey Agarwal and Sushant Thapa became first and second runner-ups respectively.

Format
A digital audition takes place prior to the physical audition. The stage performance starts with a physical audition which takes place with contestants selected from a digital audition. Only the performances of the 24 contestants selected from a physical audition are aired. Top 15 contestants are then selected by judges based on their individual stage performances. The top 15 contestants are then contested with each other to select the top 10 performances. Top 10 contestants are also selected by the judges based upon their individual stage performance.

The show then moves forward with the elimination of one contestant every week based on audience voting through the IME pay mobile app. This process continues until there are only six contestants left. All the other contestants who were eliminated earlier get a chance to comeback through a special entry program called wildcard, where two contestants are selected; one is directly chosen by the judges as performer of the week and the other one from audience voting. The show then moves ahead with the elimination of one member each week who achieves the least audience votes until the last three contestants remain for the season. The season finale airs with the remaining last three contestants. The season ends with the contestant with the highest number of audience votes along the week being declared the winner of Comedy Champion for the season.

The winner of the show wins Rs. 2,500,000 and a brand new car as the prize.

Season summary

See also 
Similar show
 Comedy Club with Champions

References

External links 

 OSR Reality on YouTube

Nepalese reality television series
Nepalese television series
2020 Nepalese television series debuts